James McCall (born 2 March 1865 in Renton, West Dunbartonshire; died 16 February 1925) was a Scottish footballer who played for Renton and Scotland.

References

Sources

External links

London Hearts profile (Scotland)
London Hearts profile (Scottish League)

1865 births
1925 deaths
Scottish footballers
Scotland international footballers
Renton F.C. players
Association football forwards
Scottish Football League players
Scottish Football League representative players
Footballers from West Dunbartonshire
People from Renton, West Dunbartonshire